The Uniting Church and Kindergarten Hall is a heritage-listed church building at 219-255 Anson Street, Orange, City of Orange, New South Wales, Australia. It is also known as Wesley Uniting Church. The property is owned by the Uniting Church in Australia. It was added to the New South Wales State Heritage Register on 2 April 1999.

There is another Uniting Church in Orange in Kite Street called St John's.

History

Heritage listing 
The Uniting Church and Kindergarten Hall was listed on the New South Wales State Heritage Register on 2 April 1999.

Gallery

See also

References

Attribution 

Orange
Orange
Articles incorporating text from the New South Wales State Heritage Register
Orange, New South Wales